Allison Janae Hamilton (born 1984) is a contemporary American artist who works in sculpture, installation, photography and film.

Early life and education 
Hamilton was born in Lexington, Kentucky, in 1984 and raised in Florida, with family rooted in Tennessee and the Carolinas.

Hamilton received her MFA in visual arts from Columbia University, PhD in American studies from New York University, MA in African-American studies from Columbia University and two BS degrees from Florida State University.

Work 
Hamilton's relationship with the locations of her upbringing and family roots forms the cornerstone of her artwork, as particularly seen in her engagement with the landscapes of Northern Florida and Western Tennessee. Using plant matter, layered imagery, complex sounds, metal, and found objects, Hamilton creates immersive spaces that consider the ways that the American landscape contributes to our ideas of "Americana"; and social relationships to space in the face of a changing climate, particularly within the rural American south.

Hamilton is known as an interdisciplinary artist, whose artwork ranges from immersive multi-channel film installations, monumental outdoor sculpture, and environmental portraits. Hamilton refers to landscape as the "central protagonist" in her work, rather than a backdrop, and through the blending of land-centered folklore and personal family narratives, she engages haunting yet epic mythologies that address the social and political concerns of today's changing terrain.

Hamilton has presented solo exhibitions at Massachusetts Museum of Contemporary Art and the Joslyn Art Museum, and has also exhibited her work at Storm King Art Center, the Museum of Modern Art, the Studio Museum in Harlem, the Smithsonian National Portrait Gallery and others. In 2021, Hamilton presented an immersive film artwork, Wacissa, on 73 screens in Times Square in New York City. She is a recipient of the Creative Capital Award and a Rema Hort Mann Foundation grant. She was a 2013-2014 fellow at the Whitney Independent Study Program, sponsored by the Whitney Museum of American Art. She has been awarded artist residencies at the Studio Museum in Harlem (New York), Recess (New York) and Fundación Botín (Santander, Spain). Work by the artist is held in public collections such as the Menil Collection, Nasher Museum of Art, Nevada Museum of Art, the Hood Museum of Art and the Speed Museum of Art.

Hamilton is represented by Marianne Boesky Gallery (New York and Aspen).

Selected solo exhibitions 
 2022 Allison Janae Hamilton: Between Life and Landscape at Georgia Museum of Art, Athens, Georgia
 2022 Allison Janae Hamilton: Recent Works at Joslyn Art Museum, Omaha, Nebraska
 2021 A Romance of Paradise at Marianne Boesky Gallery, New York
 2021 Wacissa at Times Square Arts, New York
 2020 Waters of a Lower Register at Brooklyn Bridge Park via Creative Time, New York
 2018 Allison Janae Hamilton: Pitch at Massachusetts Museum of Contemporary Art, North Adams, Massachusetts
 2018 Passage at Atlanta Contemporary, Atlanta, Georgia
 2017 Allison Janae Hamilton: Wonder Room at Recess, New York

Selected collections 
 The Menil Collection, Houston, Texas
 The Studio Museum in Harlem, New York
 Speed Art Museum, Louisville, Kentucky 
 Hessel Museum of Art, Bard College, Annandale-on-Hudson, New York
 Hood Museum of Art, Dartmouth College, Hanover, New Hampshire
 Nasher Museum of Art, Durham, North Carolina
 International African American Museum, Charleston, South Carolina
 Nevada Museum of Art, Reno, Nevada
 Williams College Museum of Art, Williamstown, Massachusetts

References 

Living people
1984 births
21st-century American women artists
21st-century African-American women
21st-century African-American artists
African-American contemporary artists
American contemporary artists
20th-century African-American people
20th-century African-American women